The American Council on African Education was established by Nwafor Orizu in 1945 which obtained numerous tuition scholarships from American sources for the benefit of African students. Amongst its important members are Alain LeRoy Locke, Oric Bates, Mary McLeod Bethune, Harry Emerson Fosdick and Constance Agatha Cummings. They were instrumental in offering scholarships to Nigerian students studying in the United States. Its membership consisted of both black and white academics, journalists and philanthropists.

References

African-American organizations